Swiss International Air Lines AG, colloquially known as SWISS, is the flag carrier of Switzerland, operating scheduled services in Europe and to North America, South America, Africa and Asia. Zurich Airport serves as its sole hub and Geneva Airport as a focus city. The airline was formed following the bankruptcy in 2002 of Swissair, Switzerland's then-flag carrier. The new airline was built around what had been Swissair's regional subsidiary, Crossair. Swiss retains Crossair's IATA code LX (Swissair's code was SR). It assumed Swissair's old ICAO code of SWR (Crossair's was CRX), to maintain international traffic rights. It is a member of Star Alliance and a subsidiary of the Lufthansa Group. Its headquarters are at EuroAirport Basel Mulhouse Freiburg near Basel, Switzerland, and an office at Zurich Airport in Kloten, Switzerland. The company's registered office is in Basel.

On 18 November 2020, it was announced that Dieter Vranckx would assume the position of CEO as of 1 January 2021. Vranckx has 20 years of experience within the Lufthansa Group and is currently CEO of Lufthansa Group member Brussels Airlines, a position he has held since the start of 2020.

History

Beginnings
Swiss was formed after the 2002 bankruptcy of Swissair, Switzerland's former flag carrier. Forty percent of Crossair's income came from Swissair. The new airline lost US$1.6 billion from 2002 to 2005. Swissair's biggest creditors, Credit Suisse and UBS, sold part of Swissair's assets to Crossair, which had been Swissair's regional counterpart. At the time, both Swissair and Crossair were part of the same holding company, SAirGroup. Crossair later changed its name to Swiss International Air Lines, and the new national airline officially started operations on 31 March 2002. The airline was initially owned by institutional investors (61.3%), the Swiss Confederation (20.3%), cantons and communities (12.2%), and others (6.2%). Swiss also owns subsidiaries Swiss Sun (100%) and Crossair Europe (99.9%). It has a total of 7,383 employees.

According to Marcel Biedermann, the managing director of intercontinental markets for Swiss, there were three possibilities: stay independent as a niche carrier, shrink to an unrecognisable level, or attach to another airline group. The last choice was taken. Swiss talked to Air France–KLM, British Airways, and Lufthansa. However, Swiss was tied up with debt and an uncertain future and seemed to be an unattractive investment. After merging with KLM, Air France said they were too busy to deal with the Swiss joining them. British Airways was open, and Oneworld partners thought Zurich Airport would be a viable alternative hub for London Heathrow.

After almost a year of disputes, Swiss was finally accepted into the Oneworld airline alliance, after having been blocked by British Airways, which competes with Swiss on many long-haul routes. On 3 June 2004, Swiss announced its decision not to join Oneworld because they did not want to integrate their current frequent flyer program into British Airways' Executive Club. Furthermore, Swiss thought the relationship was one-sided, where British Airways sapped out the benefits of the airline, but they would get no return.

Recovery
The airline annually halved its losses, and in 2006 recorded a net profit of $220 million. The net profit for 2007 was $570 million. Biedermann stated in the March 2008 edition of Airways, that "this was the beginning of getting our house back in order." He said that help was needed and looked up to Lufthansa as a comparison, so their coming together was natural, even with their differences. Even with the smaller network, Swiss carries the same number of passengers as they did in 2002.

On 22 March 2005, Lufthansa Group confirmed its plan to take over Swiss, starting with a minority stake (11%) in a new company set up to hold Swiss shares called Air Trust. Swiss operations were gradually integrated with Lufthansa's from late 2005, and the takeover was completed on 1 July 2007. Swiss joined Star Alliance and became a member of Lufthansa's Miles and More frequent flyer program on 1 April 2006.

The airline set up a regional airline subsidiary called Swiss European Air Lines. The carrier had its own air operator's certificate. Two divisions -–Swiss Aviation Training and Swiss WorldCargo (using the belly capacity of passenger planes) – are also owned by Swiss. Swiss European Air Lines (later renamed Swiss Global Air Lines) has since ceased operations and merged with its parent, Swiss.

In 2008, Swiss International Air Lines acquired Edelweiss Air
 and Servair – later renamed Swiss Private Aviation. In February 2011, Swiss Private Aviation ceased operations as a result of restructuring. The company recommended using Lufthansa Private Jet Service instead.

In 2007, Swiss ordered nine Airbus A330-300s to gradually replace existing A330-200s and have three-class seating. The first A330-300 was put into service on the flagship Zürich to New York-JFK route in April 2009. In spring 2010 Swiss operated five A330-300s on medium and long-haul routes. The remaining four A330-300 aircraft joined the fleet in 2011.

Takeover by Lufthansa
Following Lufthansa Group's takeover, the regional fleet was changed from Crossair's Embraer ERJs and Saabs to Avro RJs, which were flown by a wholly owned subsidiary, Swiss Global Air Lines. The rest of the fleet was rationalised and now mainly consists of Airbus aircraft, apart from the Boeing 777. Swiss also renegotiated their supplier contracts, including ground handling, maintenance, food service, and labour. Swiss shareholders received a performance-based option for their shares. The payment was in 2008, and the amount depended on how well Lufthansa's shares compared with competitors' shares. Lufthansa continues to maintain Swiss as a separate brand.

In 2010, Swiss and Lufthansa have named in a European Commission investigation into price-fixing but were not fined due to acting as a whistleblower.

On 18 August 2011, Swiss introduced a new company logo which resembled the logo of the defunct Swissair.

Corporate affairs

Head office

Swiss International Air Lines has its operational headquarters at EuroAirport Basel Mulhouse Freiburg near Basel, Switzerland. The French-Swiss airport is located on French territory and has customs-free access to Switzerland. The Swiss head office is located in the Swiss section of the airport, and it is only accessible from Switzerland. According to the commercial register, the legal seat is in Basel itself.

Swiss International Air Lines' head office was previously the head office of Crossair. In 2002 the "Crossair" sign on the building was replaced by a "Swiss International Air Lines" one. As of 2004 the Basel area offices housed about 1,000 employees, while the Zurich area offices housed about 850 employees. When Swiss started as a company, about 1,400-1,500 worked at the Basel offices.

Swiss also operates offices at Zurich Airport in Kloten and at Geneva Airport.

Subsidiaries
The following companies are part of the Swiss International Air Lines Group:
 Edelweiss Air
 Swiss AviationSoftware
 Swiss Aviation Training
 Swiss WorldCargo
 SWISStours

Inflight service
On European flights, Swiss serves drinks. Depending on the time of day and the duration of the flight, Swiss may also serve snacks. Cold snacks are served on shorter flights, and hot ones on longer flights. Economy class service includes sandwiches from a Swiss bakery. A small bar of Swiss chocolate branded with the word "SWISS" and the distinctive tail fin is provided to passengers before landing on all flights. For its services to and from Geneva Airport on Airbus A220 aircraft a buy on board system called Swiss Saveurs is available.

Trains and buses
Swiss' Airtrain service allows passengers to take any SBB train at no extra charge from Zurich Airport to Basel SBB railway station and Lugano railway station. Swiss previously operated a Swissbus service from Ottawa Railway Station to Montréal–Trudeau airport in Montreal.

Destinations

Codeshare agreements
Swiss codeshares with the following airlines:

 Air Canada
 Air China
 Air France
 Air India
 Air Malta
 All Nippon Airways
 Asiana Airlines
 Austrian Airlines
 Avianca
 Brussels Airlines
 Cathay Pacific
 Croatia Airlines
 Edelweiss Air (Subsidiary)
 Egyptair
 El Al
 Eurowings
 LOT Polish Airlines
 Lufthansa
 Scandinavian Airlines
 Singapore Airlines
 South African Airways
 TAP Air Portugal
 Thai Airways International
 United Airlines
 Vistara

Interline agreements
Swiss has interline agreements with the following airlines:

 Aerolíneas Argentinas
 Aeroméxico
 Air Austral
 Air Dolomiti
 Air Mauritius
 American Airlines
 Bangkok Airways
 British Airways
 China Airlines
 China Eastern Airlines
 China Southern Airlines
 Condor Flugdienst
 Delta Air Lines
 Emirates
 Finnair
 Gol Transportes Aéreos
 Gulf Air
 Helvetic Airways
 Iberia
 Icelandair
 ITA Airways
 Japan Airlines
 Jetstar Airways
 Kenya Airways
 KLM
 Korean Air
 LATAM Chile
 Luxair
 Malaysia Airlines
 Mandarin Airlines
 Middle East Airlines
 Oman Air
 Pakistan International Airlines
 Precision Air
 Qantas
 Qatar Airways
 Rossiya Airlines
 Saudia
 Shanghai Airlines
 SunExpress
 SriLankan Airlines
 Turkish Airlines
 Vietnam Airlines
 Virgin Atlantic

Fleet

Current fleet
, Swiss International Air Lines (excluding its subsidiary Edelweiss Air) operates the following aircraft. Additionally, Helvetic Airways operates ten Embraer 190s on behalf of Swiss. Following Helvetic Airways' acquisition of the type, Helvetic Airways will also operate Embraer 190-E2 aircraft on behalf of Swiss.

Fleet development
On 22 September 2010, Lufthansa announced an order for 48 new aircraft, several of them for Swiss.

In March 2013, Swiss ordered six Boeing 777-300ERs. On 12 March 2015, Swiss confirmed Lufthansa Group had ordered an additional three Boeing 777-300ERs for Swiss. The 777s will be operated by, and leased back from, Swiss Global Air Lines. Swiss has confirmed that all 777-300ERs will have an updated First Class cabin with eight private suites and a 32-inch TV, 62 business class seats which convert into a fully flat bed that is over two meters long, and 270 economy seats, with 10 seats abreast in a 3-4-3 layout, using the same seat pitch and width on its A330s and A340s on the 777s. The first of these new airliners was delivered in January 2016 The Boeing aircraft will replace most of Swiss' A340 aircraft while the remaining five A340s were refurbished.

In 2014, Swiss announced it would refurbish its A320 fleet, with new interiors and the older A320s and A321s were to be replaced by A320/A321neos. The A319s, along with Swiss Global Air Lines' Avro fleet, were replaced by Bombardier CS300 aircraft. The last Avro RJ100 aircraft, HB-IYZ, completed its final flight, LX7545 from Geneva to Zurich on 15 August 2017.

Swiss' first Airbus A220, then known as the Bombardier CS300, entered service on 1 June 2017, with its maiden commercial flight from Geneva to London-Heathrow. Swiss was the launch customer of the Airbus A220 family (formerly known as Bombardier CSeries), with its first CSeries aircraft, a CS100 (A220-100), delivered to the airline in June 2016 and registered HB-JBA. The first commercial flight performed led from Zurich to Paris-Charles de Gaulle.

The Boeing 777-300ER and Airbus A220-100/-300 (Bombardier CS100/CS300) aircraft were operated by Swiss Global Air Lines until the subsidiary ceased operations in April 2018, in an attempt to lower administration costs and simplify Swiss' fleet structuring.

Adria Airways operated two Saab 2000s on the Zurich-Lugano route, which was suspended after Adria's bankruptcy on 30 September 2019.

Retired fleet

Accidents and incidents 
 On 10 July 2002, Swiss International Air Lines Flight 850, a Saab 2000 crashed at Werneuchen Airfield due to improper weather information and improper markings on the runway, resulting in the collapse of the landing gear and fire being spread throughout the aircraft. Everyone on board survived, however, the aircraft was written off.

References
 
 Ken Donohue, "Swiss continues a proud tradition", Airways Magazine: A Global Review of Commercial Flight, March 2008, 22–23, 25, 28.

External links

 Official website
 Swiss World Cargo
 Swiss Aviation Training 

Airlines established in 2002
Airlines of Switzerland
Association of European Airlines members
Companies based in Basel
Lufthansa Group
Star Alliance
Swiss companies established in 2002